Sawaran may refer to:
Savaran (disambiguation), places in Iran
Sawran, Syria
Sawran (Kazakhstan)